Fethi Gürcan (1922 – 27 June 1964) was a Turkish major and equestrian. He competed in two events at the 1956 Summer Olympics. He was executed by the Turkish government in 1964 for his role in a coup attempt two years earlier.

See also
 1962 attempted coup in Turkey

References

External links
 

1922 births
1964 deaths
Turkish male equestrians
Olympic equestrians of Turkey
Equestrians at the 1956 Summer Olympics
People from Ereğli, Konya
20th-century executions by Turkey
Turkish Army officers